Anthony M. Jones (Tone) is a music producer / songwriter. Artists and groups he has produced for include Ariana Grande, Justin Bieber, John Legend, 24kGoldn, Sabrina Carpenter, Fifth Harmony, Post Malone, Juice Wrld, Mary J. Blige, and Keri Hilson.

The single "About Us" which he produced for Neverest won a SOCAN No. 1 Song Award. The music video reached #1 on the MuchMore video countdown in February 2011.  Other notable singles Jones has produced include "Last Time" by George Nozuka, and "All Said And Done" by Chevy Woods feat. Dej Loaf.

Production discography

Contributions to Full Lengths and Compilations

Non-album singles, other

Musical Director

Awards and nominations

References

External links
 
 
 

Record producers from Pennsylvania
Songwriters from Pennsylvania
Living people
Musicians from Pittsburgh
1982 births